Corte Suprema de Justicia, Spanish for Supreme Court of Justice, may refer to:

Supreme Court of Argentina
Supreme Court of Bolivia
Supreme Court of Chile
Supreme Court of Justice of Colombia
Supreme Court of Justice of Costa Rica
Supreme Court of the Dominican Republic
Supreme Court of El Salvador
Supreme Court of Justice of Guatemala
Supreme Court of Honduras
Supreme Court of Justice of the Nation (Mexico)
Supreme Court of Justice of Paraguay
Supreme Court of Peru
Supreme Court of Uruguay
Supreme Court of Justice of Venezuela